Rubén Millán Rodríguez (born 16 February 1992) is a Spanish sprint canoeist.

He participated at the 2018 ICF Canoe Sprint World Championships.

References

External links
 
 

1992 births
Living people
Spanish male canoeists
ICF Canoe Sprint World Championships medalists in kayak
European Games competitors for Spain
Canoeists at the 2015 European Games
21st-century Spanish people